Kula (Busovača) is a village in the municipality of Busovača, Bosnia and Herzegovina.

Demographics 
According to the 2013 census, its population was 336.

References

Populated places in Busovača